The Gay Football Supporters Network ("GFSN") is a U.K. non-profit organisation founded in early 1989 by a small group of gay  football fans. This group went on to campaign for the view that homosexuality did not preclude an active interest in and support for the game and the GFSN now encompasses Supporting, Campaigning and Playing elements.

History and set-up
The Gay Football Supporters Network, founded by William Lehauli, began meeting at the Salmon & Compasses public house in Chapel Market, North London in early 1989; it later expanded into a truly national organisation across the UK and now also includes Republic of Ireland citizens as members.

Supporting
The GFSN divides the country up into "regions", with each region having a co-ordinator. This co-ordinator is responsible for arranging social events for members in that region, and members regularly meet to attend matches or simply watch a game at a local pub.

Football fans of different ages and genders meet regularly to discuss their favourite sport and chat. Each co-ordinator submits a monthly report on activities & social events, and these reports are then included in the network's monthly newsletter, which is emailed to members.

Campaigning
As well as providing a forum for gay football supporters to meet, the GFSN also campaigns against anti-homosexual discrimination in support of the FA's "Football For All" programme. The FA encourages all clubs to endorse a gay-tolerant position, parallelling similar calls in the 1980s for clubs to support racial tolerance. The GFSN has worked in collaboration with Paddy Power and Stonewall to support the anti-homophobia rainbow laces initiative.

A monthly GFSN newsletter regularly features articles taken from the national press relating to the topic. The network has also featured in articles printed in The Independent, AXM and The Times.

Playing
Some members prefer to play rather or as well as to watch, and around the UK new football clubs have emerged as members come together to play. The two longest established teams still in existence are Leicester Wildecats FC and Village Manchester FC; both formed in 1996. Teams from the Republic of Ireland are welcomed as associate members and often attend GFSN tournaments.

GFSN League

Rivalries formed between a number of the members and their clubs, leading to the formation of the GFSN National 11-a-side League in 2002.

Four clubs initially entered the league; Bristol Panthers F.C, Leftfooters F.C, Yorkshire Terriers F.C. and Leicester Wildecats F.C.  The inaugural winners of this competition were the Bristol Panthers.

The current champions (2012-13 season) are London Falcons GFC.

Tournaments
5- or 6-a-side tournaments are hosted by clubs across the country, which are extremely popular events for teams and players to meet-up and socialise.  Yorkshire Terriers and Leicester Wildecats have held annual tournaments for more than the last ten years.  Other clubs to host tournaments include London Titans FC, Hotscots FC and Bristol Panthers FC.

Leftfooters FC hosted an annual 11-a-side tournament in April at Regent's Park, which is also open to inclusion from European teams.

GFSN Summer Get-together
Coinciding with the GFSN Annual General Meeting of members, a 5-a-side tournament is held with almost all the UK's gay teams taking part over a weekend in late May or early June.  It is widely accepted to be the biggest and most anticipated event organised by the GFSN, enabling players and members to socialise over the weekend.  A "host" city is chosen each year - voted for by GFSN members throughout the preceding autumn.  The result is announced at the annual GFSN Christmas Dinner.

AGM

The GFSN Annual General Meeting is usually held the Sunday morning after the Saturday activities (tournament, watching professional games, party). Here various agenda items are discussed and the members can vote on the committee members for the next 12 months. Venues for the AGM have ranged from bars to Cardiff's Millennium Stadium.

Tournament

The tournament was dominated by the Leicester Wildecats for the first 6 years, but has since been claimed by Brighton Bandits (now called GFC Brighton & Hove) and Yorkshire Terriers, who successfully defended their title in 2006. In 2005, the competition format was altered slightly.  All teams initially compete together in a group stage, with the winners progressing to the knock-out phase of the main trophy.  Teams that are knocked out of the main competition then transfer to the "Vase" trophy - a less prestigious (yet equally competitive) knock-out competition, with the winner claiming a trophy that is usually a cheap, rusting item bought from a local bric-a-brac store (to emphasise the lack of grandeur compared with the main tournament).

This change was introduced to give competing teams more opportunity to play football, instead of being knocked out early on in the tournament after a short number of games.

Further reading 
 Beasley, Neil (2016) Football's Coming Out: Life as a Gay Fan and Player. [London]: Floodlit Dreams Ltd.

See also
GFSN National League
Homosexuality in association football
International Gay and Lesbian Football Association
List of IGLFA member clubs
List of LGBT sportspeople

References

External links
Gay Football Supporters Network Official Website
GFSN League Official Website 
Football v Homophobia, incorporating The Justin Campaign
Pride Sports
GFSN Feature: Daily Star article, July 2005

GFSN League members, associate and affiliated clubs

London, Kent and Sussex
Leftfooters F.C. - London
London Titans F.C.
London Falcons F.C.
London Phoenix F.C.
London Romans A.F.C
Stonewall F.C. - London
Bexley Invicta F.C. - SE London & Kent
GFC Brighton & Hove

Midlands
Birmingham Blaze F.C.
Leicester Wildecats F.C.
Nottingham Ball Bois F.C.
Wolves Warriors A.F.C. - Wolverhampton

North of England
Mersey Marauders F.C. - Liverpool
Newcastle Panthers F.C.
Village Manchester F.C.
Yorkshire Terriers F.C.

South and South West
GFC Bournemouth & Hampshire
Bristol Panthers F.C.
Devon Lions F.C. 
Trowbridge Tigers F.C.

Wales
Cardiff Dragons F.C.

Scotland
Hotscots F.C. - Edinburgh
Saltire Thistle F.C. - Glasgow

Ireland
Dublin Devils F.C.

Association football organizations
LGBT sports organisations in the United Kingdom
Association football supporters
1989 establishments in the United Kingdom
1989 in British sport
1989 in association football